Arthur Baldwin Sansom Jr. (September 16, 1920 – July 4, 1991), better known as Art Sansom,  was an American comic strip cartoonist who created the long-running comic strip The Born Loser.

He was born in East Cleveland, Ohio. After graduating with an art degree from Ohio Wesleyan University in 1942, Sansom worked as an engineer/draftsman for General Electric.

In addition, Art Sansom worked on the short-lived Comic Strip Dusty Chaps with his son Chip Sanson from 1982-1983.

Sansom created the strip Chris Welkin—Planeteer with Russ Winterbotham which ran from 1952 until 1964. In 1965, he created The Born Loser for the Newspaper Enterprise Association. In the mid-1980s, he was assisted on the strip by his son Chip Sansom, who assumed responsibility for the strip upon his death.

Awards
He received the National Cartoonists Society's Reuben Award for best humor comic strip in 1987 and 1991.

He is buried in Lakewood Park Cemetery in Rocky River, Ohio.

References

Sources
Strickler, Dave. Syndicated Comic Strips and Artists, 1924-1995: The Complete Index. Cambria, California: Comics Access, 1995.

External links
NCS Awards
Lambiek: Art Sansom

1920 births
1991 deaths
People from East Cleveland, Ohio
American comic strip cartoonists
Ohio Wesleyan University alumni
Burials at Lakewood Park Cemetery